Miglio is a surname. Notable people with the surname include:

Arrigo Miglio (born 1942), Italian Roman Catholic archbishop
Gianfranco Miglio (1918-2001), Italian jurist, political scientist and politician 
Pietro Miglio (1910-1992), Italian footballer

See also
Mile#Italian mile